Tomas Ross (Den Bommel, 16 September 1944) is a Dutch writer who is famous for his historical criminal thrillers.

He was born as Willem Pieter Hogendoorn in Den Bommel (Goeree-Overflakkee). He has used the pseudonym Tomas Ross since 1980. His father P.G. Hogendoorn was a member of a resistance group during the 2nd world war.

Bibliography
 2019: Blonde Dolly
 2018: Het verdriet van Wilhelmina (The India Trilogy, part 3)
 2017: De Schaduw en het mysterie van De Denker (in the Literary Jewels series)
 2017: De onderkoning van Indië (The India Trilogy, part 2)
 2016: Zwarte weduwe (coauthored by Corine Hartman)
 2016: Mensenjacht (in the Literary Jewels series)
 2015: Van de doden niets dan goed (The India Trilogy, part 1)
 2015: Doodskopvlinder (coauthored by Corine Hartman)
 2014: De vrienden van Pinocchio
 2013: De Tweede November
 2013: De nachtwaker: Het koningscomplot, (who was the biological father of Queen Wilhelmina?)
 2012: Onze vrouw in Tripoli (about Princess Mabel of Orange-Nassau)
 2011: Havank Ross: de Schaduw contra de Schorpioen 
 2011: Kort (short stories)
 2011: Havank Ross: de Schaduw en het mysterie van de Denker
 2010: De tweede verlosser
 2010: Havank Ross: Het mysterie van de Nachtwacht
 2009: Het Meisje uit Buenos Aires (about (Queen) Máxima)
 2009: Beestachtig
 2008: Blonde Dolly (serial Haagse Courant)
 2008: Havank Ross: Caribisch complot
 2008: De Marionet (about Pim Fortuyn)
 2007: De Tranen van Mata Hari
 2006: King Kong (about the Anjercode)
 2005: De hand van god
 2005: De Anjercode (about the Dubbelganger)
 2004: Bloed aan de paal
 2004: Kidnap  co-author: Rinus Ferdinandusse
 2004: De dubbelganger
 2003: De klokkenluider
 2003: De mannen van de maandagochtend  co-author: Rinus Ferdinandusse
 2003: De zesde mei
 2003: Mathilde
 2002: De dood van een kroonprins
 2002: Omwille van de troon
 2001: Tranen over Hollandia
 1998: Het goud van Salomon Pinto
 1997: De vlucht van de vierde oktober
 1996: Koerier voor Sarajevo
 1995: De broederschap
 1994: De man van Sint Maarten
 1993: Wachters voor Wilhelmina
 1992: De ingewijden
 1991: Walhalla
 1991: De moordmagnaten
 1990: De vrouw die op Greta Garbo leek (with Maj Sjöwall)
 1989: Donor
 1989: Mode voor Moskou
 1989: De strijders van de regenboog
 1987: Bèta
 1984: Het Poesjkin Plan
 1983: Het verraad van '42 
 1980: De honden van het verraad

Children and Teen Fiction
 2002: De man die twee keer verdronk
 2002: Het geheim van het verdronken dorp
 1993: De wraak van Victor Baldini
 1992: Het levende lijk
 1990: Help, ze ontvoeren de koningin
 Raadsel van de Ringen
 2001: De verborgen poort
 2000: De stem in de grot
 1999: Talisman
 Een Daan en Doortje mysterie
 1994: Daan en Doortje en het monster van Loch Ness
 1994: Daan en Doortje en de poldergeesten

External links
 Tomas Ross Biography (Dutch)

1944 births
Living people
Dutch screenwriters
Dutch male screenwriters
Dutch crime fiction writers
Dutch relationships and sexuality writers
Dutch children's writers
Dutch speculative fiction writers
Dutch essayists
Dutch republicans
Dutch mystery writers
Dutch political writers
Dutch critics
Dutch male novelists
People from Oostflakkee
Dutch male dramatists and playwrights
Male essayists
20th-century essayists
21st-century essayists
20th-century Dutch novelists
20th-century Dutch male writers
21st-century Dutch novelists
21st-century Dutch male writers
20th-century Dutch dramatists and playwrights
21st-century Dutch dramatists and playwrights